Yani Benjamin Rosenthal Hidalgo (born 14 July 1965 in San Pedro Sula, Honduras) is a businessman, politician and former convict.

Personal data
His parents are Jaime Rosenthal and Miriam Marina Hidalgo de Rosenthal. He has a sister, Patricia, and three brothers: Jaime (deceased), Carlos José and César Augusto. He is married to Claudia Madrid. They have four daughters: Isabella, Victoria, Elissa and Alexandra.

In 1993 his house suffered damage from a bomb attack. Rosenthal was Director of Diario Tiempo (Honduras Times Newspaper) and published a series of articles about military abuses, and, as his home was the temporary shelter for a witness to a military-performed killing, it has been alleged that the military was involved in the bomb attack.

Education
Rosenthal studied high school at Bilingual School: Escuela Internacional Sampedrana in San Pedro Sula, he is a lawyer graduated from UNAH-Universidad Nacional Autónoma de Honduras (Honduras National Autonomous University) and has an MBA from INCAE. In 1998 the Honduras Supreme Court of Justice granted him the title of Notary public.

Political career
Rosenthal began his work as an activist for the Liberal Party at a young age.

Rosenthal was an alternate member of the Liberal Party's Central Executive Committee from 2001 to 2005 and a full member as Secretary of International Relations from 2005 to 2009.

When Mel Zelaya took office on 27 January 2006 as Honduras President, Rosenthal was appointed as Minister of the Presidency. Due to his lack of any public service experience, his appointment was criticized in the local media, since it was seen as a result of the political negotiations of his father.  Jaime Rosenthal Sr. has backed Yani in the political arena in recent years. After the death of his younger brother Jaime in a gun accident, Yani was seen as the natural successor to his father.

His previous experience was very limited. He was advisor of San Pedro Sula municipality when Jerónimo Sandoval Sorto was mayor of the city (1986–1990). Also he was the coordinator of the presidential campaign of his father Jaime Rosenthal and in 2005 after an internal election within the Liberal Party, he was regional coordinator of Mel Zelaya presidential campaign.

In December 2006 Diario La Tribuna (La Tribuna newspaper) carried out a  poll among a number of broadcasters. It showed that Rosenthal had the highest favorable opinion of all Ministers of the Mel Zelaya administration. The results have little statistical merit since the broadcaster's population polled was just over 100 and his family owns several broadcasting companies including television (Canal 11) and a newspaper (Diario Tiempo) which employ many of the polled broadcasters.  On January 24, 2007 CID-Gallup published a public opinion poll. The results indicated that Rosenthal had a 24% favorable opinion.

In December 2006 and January 2007 he suffered severe criticism from his own party members, after he announced the results of an evaluation process of all government ministers and other executives of which he was in charge. Rosenthal was the only minister not evaluated.  Several well-known members of the Partido Liberal failed the examination and only a few were removed from their posts. This internal dispute extended all the way to the Vice President of Honduras Elvin Santos, who declared publicly that Rosenthal was unfit to evaluate him.

Rosenthal also headed the process of adjudication of import rights of oil products into the country.  This process was adjudicated in 2006 to ConocoPhillips. ChevronTexaco, Exxon and Shell were left out of the importing business in Honduras, in which they had operated for decades.  This process which Rosenthal has led with other officials close to President Zelaya has been under constant criticism from the private sector in Honduras, as well as from the government of the United States.  ConocoPhilips, despite winning the monopoly rights of  importing oil in the country, lacks storage facilities.  Chevron, Exxon and Shell have refused to lease to ConnocoPhillips or the Government their respective facilities.  After this refusal President Zelaya pushed for an executive mandate to force multinational companies to lease their facilities under a price point set by  the government.

On 16 January 2007, the US Ambassador in Honduras Charles Ford, expressed publicly his concern derived about the executive mandate to force a lease of oil storage facilities to the government.

On 17 January 2007, President Manuel Zelaya's legal advisor Enrique Flores said the government would not take control of the terminal owned by Chevron, but would take control of two oil storage terminals owned by Honduran company DIPPSA, including one in which Exxon Mobil owns a 50% stake.

On 31 December 2007, Yani Rosenthal resigned as Minister of the Presidency. He was running to be elected in the internal primary election within the Liberal Party to become the candidate for the 2010 Honduras Presidency, but joined his political movement with another candidate: Roberto Micheleti and on 30 November 2008 his movement lost the internal election.

Independent media in Honduras have been critical of Arcadia's methods, and reports appearing in independent newspaper La Tribuna and other news outlets have denounced Arcadia's declarations as false 

Rosenthal participated in both the primary election in the liberal party in 2008 and the general election in 2009 and was elected congressman for the 2010-2014 period.

In March 2010, the newly elected Lobo government sent a package of new taxes to government, which have been opposed and denounced by Rosenthal as extremely onerous to the poorest people in Honduras.

Arrest and criminal indictment
In 2015, Yani Rosenthal along with his cousin Yankel, and his father Jaime were indicted under the Kingpin Act for "provide[ing] money laundering and other services that support the international narcotics-trafficking activities of multiple Central American drug traffickers and their criminal organizations". Both pled guilty. On 15 December 2017, the U.S. Attorney announced that Rosenthal was sentenced to 3 years in prison. On 19 January 2017, his cousin, Yankel Rosenthal announced that he was sentenced to 29 months after pleading guilty to the lesser charge of attempting to launder drug money from Honduras. American authorities tried unsuccessfully to extradite his father, Jaime (who died in Honduras on 12 January 2018).

2021 Presidential campaign 
After his return to Honduras Yani Rosenthal started a presidential campaign with the Liberal Party. He won the party-internal primaries, held on 14 March 2021, against his competitors Luis Zelaya, then Chairman of the Liberal Party, and Ángel Darío Banegas Darío Banegas, a Member of Congress and TV-Show host. Yani Rosenthal gained 49.97% of votes, Luis Zelaya gained 33.94% and Darío Banegas 16.09%. Following the primaries he entered the second round of campaigning. Together with Nasry Asfura (National Party) and Xiomara Castro (LIBRE) he was considered to be among the top-three contenders for the presidential elections held on 28 November 2021. Yani lost the presidential election, coming in third place with just 170,638 or 9.21% of the vote.

References

1965 births
Living people
People from San Pedro Sula
Honduran businesspeople
Honduran Jews
Government ministers of Honduras
Liberal Party of Honduras politicians
Deputies of the National Congress of Honduras
Honduran people of Romanian-Jewish descent